Kiss FM, Kiss Radio or variants may refer to:

Asia-Oceania
 Various Kiss FM-branded stations in the Philippines
 95.1 Kiss FM, Lucena, Quezon
 102.3 Kiss FM, Tagbilaran, Bohol
 Kiss92 FM, Singapore
KISS 969, Sri Lanka
 Kiss Radio Taiwan, the radio station playing Chinese music and some English top 40 songs
 Kiss-FM KOBE, Japan

Australia
 KIIS FM, a contemporary hit radio network
 KIIS 101.1 Melbourne, Victoria
 KIIS 106.5 Sydney, New South Wales
 Kiss FM Australia
 Kiss 90 FM, an earlier aspirant community radio station
 Kiss FM (now Move FM) Lithgow, New South Wales

Europe
 98.8 KISS FM Berlin, Germany
 Kiss (UK radio station), previously known as "Kiss 100" and "Kiss FM"
 Kiss 101, previously known as "Vibe 101", based in South Wales and Severn Estuary area, including Bristol
 Kiss 102, operated by Faze FM, based in Manchester - now part of the Capital brand
 Kiss 105, operated by Faze FM, based in Yorkshire - now part of the Capital brand
 Kiss 105-108, previously known as "Vibe 105-108", based in the East of England
 Kiss FM (Bosnia and Herzegovina), a Bosnian commercial station broadcasting from Kiseljak
 Kiss FM Chisinau, better known as "100.9FM", Moldovan branch of Kiss FM Romania
 Kiss FM (Finland), owned by SBS Broadcasting Group and now defunct
 Kiss FM (Portugal), radio station based in Algarve
 Kiss FM (Romania), a syndicated national Romanian radio network with headquarters in Bucharest
 Kiss FM (Spain),  see List of radio stations in Spain
 Kiss FM (Ukraine), see List of radio stations in Ukraine

North America
 106.1 Kiss FM, George Town, Cayman Islands

Canada 
 Most Kiss FM in Canada is owned by Rogers Media
 CHUR-FM, branded as "KiSS 100.5", in North Bay, Ontario
 CISS-FM, branded as "KiSS 105.3", in Ottawa, Ontario
 CHAS-FM, branded as "KiSS 100.5", in Sault Ste. Marie, Ontario
 CJMX-FM, branded as "KiSS 105.3", in Sudbury, Ontario
 CKGB-FM, branded as "KiSS 99.3", in Timmins, Ontario
 CKIS-FM, branded as "KiSS 92.5", in Toronto, Ontario
 CHFM-FM, formerly known as "KiSS 95.9", in Calgary, Alberta
 CFRV-FM, branded as "KiSS 107.7", in Lethbridge, Alberta
 CKY-FM, branded as "KiSS 102.3", in Winnipeg, Manitoba
 CKKS-FM, branded as "KiSS RADiO", in Chilliwack, British Columbia
 CHTT-FM, formerly branded as "KiSS 103.1", in Victoria, British Columbia
 CHBN-FM, branded as "KiSS 91.7", in Edmonton, Alberta
 CHMX-FM, formerly known as "Kiss 92 FM", in Regina, Saskatchewan (owned by Harvard Broadcasting)
 CKIZ-FM, formerly known as "107.5 Kiss FM", in Vernon, British Columbia (owned by Jim Pattison Group)

United States
 KISS-FM (brand), a brand name used by Top 40 stations, several of which owned by iHeartMedia
 KHKS-FM, better known as "106.1 KISS-FM", in Dallas
 KIIS-FM, also known as "102.7 KIIS-FM", Top 40 station (owned by iHeartMedia as its flagship "KISS-FM" brand)
 KKDM, also known as "Kiss 1075", in Des Moines, Iowa
 KSME, better known as "96.1 Kiss FM" in Greeley, Colorado
 KUUL, also known as "101.3 KISS FM" in East Moline, Illinois
 KWNW, branded as "101.9 Kiss FM"; licensed in Crawfordsville, Arkansas, and broadcasting in Memphis, Tennessee
 KZZP, better known as "104.7 Kiss-FM", in Phoenix, Arizona
 WAEV-FM, better known as "97.3 KISSFM", in Savannah, Georgia
 WAKS, also known as "96.5 KISS-FM", in Cleveland, Ohio
 WFKS, also known as "Kiss 95.1", in Melbourne, Florida
 WKFS, also known as "Kiss 107", in Cincinnati, Ohio
 WKSC-FM, also known as "103.5 KISS FM", in Chicago, Illinois
 WKSS, also known as "Kiss 95.7", in Hartford, Connecticut
 WKST-FM, also known as "96.1 Kiss", in Pittsburgh, Pennsylvania
 WPIA, better known as "98.5 Kiss FM", in Peoria, Illinois (owned by Independence Media; uses the KISS FM logo under license from iHeartMedia)
 WVKS, also known as "92.5 KISS-FM", in Toledo, Ohio
 WXKS-FM, better known as "Kiss 108", in Boston - America's original KISS
 KCRS-FM "103-3 Kiss FM" in Midland/Odessa, Texas (owned by ICA)
 KISS-FM, "Kiss Rocks 99.5 FM", in San Antonio, Texas (owned by Cox Radio)
 KKSS "Kiss 97.3" in Santa Fe, New Mexico (owned by American General Media)
 KTRS-FM, better as "104.7 Kiss FM", in Casper, Wyoming (owned by Townsquare Media)
 KXSS-FM "96.9 Kiss-FM" in Amarillo, Texas (owned by Townsquare Media)
 KZII "102.5 Kiss-FM" in Lubbock, Texas (owned by Townsquare Media)
 WDMK, better known as "105.9 Kiss FM" in Detroit, Michigan (owned by Radio One)
 WKSE, "Kiss 98.5", in Buffalo, New York (owned by Audacy)
 WMKS, formerly known as "100.3 Kiss FM" in High Point, North Carolina (owned by iHeartRadio)
 WNKS, "Kiss 95.1", in Charlotte, North Carolina (owned by the Beasley Broadcast Group)
 WRKS (now WEPN), better known as "98.7 Kiss FM", former legendary soul and R&B station in New York City (owned by Emmis Communications)
 WSKU, better known as "105.5 Kiss-FM", in Utica, New York (owned by Roser Communications Network)
 WXSS, better known as "103.7 Kiss FM", in Milwaukee, Wisconsin (owned by Audacy)
 WLYK, known as "Kiss 102.7", in Cape Vincent, New York, targeting Kingston, Canada (owned by Rogers Media) 
 KKST, known as "Kiss 98.7", in Alexandria, Louisiana (owned by Cenla Broadcasting)